Brina Bračko (born 12 January 2000) is a Slovenian volleyball player, a member of the Slovenia women's national volleyball team and OK Nova KBM Branik.

Honours 
Nova KBM Branik
Slovenian League:
2017, 2018, 2019
Slovenian Cup:
2017, 2018, 2020

References

External links
 WorldofVolley profile
 U18.Girls.2017.Volleyball.FIVB profile

2000 births
Living people
Sportspeople from Maribor
Slovenian women's volleyball players